These are the official results of the Men's 4 × 400 metre relay event at the 1988 Summer Olympics in Seoul, South Korea. There were a total number of 21 nations competing.

Summary
In the semi-final round, the US team with reserves Antonio McKay and Andrew Valmon won the first semi with a time more than a second and a half faster than all the qualifiers from the second semi who were pressed by a stubborn Yugoslavian team.  The second semi was barely won by East Germany in a highly competitive 3:00.60 which they were not able to duplicate the following day in the final.

In the final, US led off by the bronze medalist Danny Everett, started in lane 2.  From the gun, Everett was making up the stagger on GDR's Jens Carlowitz immediately to his outside.  Also advancing in lane 5 was Sunday Uti for Nigeria, clearly separating from Jamaica's Howard Davis to his inside, Uti having an apparent lead onto the homestretch.  As Uit passed on the inside, Kenya's Tito Sawe accelerated past Australia's Robert Ballard, trying to keep up.  Uti tied up a little on the straight, US and Nigeria passing about the same time.  Everett's split timed at 44.0.  America's young gold medalist Steve Lewis took the lead through the turn, as Moses Ugbusien did not maintain Uti's pace.  After taking the baton in fourth place, Devon Morris blazed through the turn to position Jamaica in second place at the break.  After that exuberance, Morris slowed the second half of the lap, but still maintained second place as the rest of the field closed behind him.  But out front, Lewis took a 4 metre lead at the break and extended it to 25, putting the race away early.  Lewis' split 43.4.

Mathias Schersing passed Ugbusien and in the last steps, Morris, on the final straightaway, giving East Germany second place at the handoff, but they were almost 3 seconds behind Kevin Robinzine.  Running alone, Robinzine extended the lead as Jamaica battled back, Winthrop Graham passing Frank Möller on the home stretch and West Germany's Jörg Vaihinger pulling them into contention.   After a 44.8 split, Robinzine passed to the newly crowned World Record holder and silver medalist Butch Reynolds.  Almost 4 seconds later, Jamaica's 1983 world champion Bert Cameron was the next pursuer.  Through the penultimate turn Ralf Lübke stuck to Cameron's shoulder, West Germany separating from East Germany's reigning world champion Thomas Schönlebe on the backstretch.  All eyes were on Reynolds, would the US break the 20 year old world record.  Lightbeam timing on the finish line said he missed it by .01, but when the official time was read, it equalled the world record.  Jamaica finished more than four seconds later with the silver medal, with West Germany taking bronze.

Medalists

Records
These were the standing world and Olympic records (in minutes) prior to the 1988 Summer Olympics.

The following Olympic records were set during this competition. The United States equalled the world record in the final.

Final
Held on Saturday October 1, 1988

Semifinals
Held on Friday September 30, 1988

Heats
Held on Friday September 30, 1988

See also
 1986 Men's European Championships 4 × 400 m Relay (Stuttgart)
 1987 Men's World Championships 4 × 400 m Relay (Rome)
 1990 Men's European Championships 4 × 400 m Relay (Split)
 1991 Men's World Championships 4 × 400 m Relay (Tokyo)

References

External links
 Official Report
 Results

R
Relay foot races at the Olympics
Men's events at the 1988 Summer Olympics